John Thune (born 2 February 1948) is a Norwegian politician for the Christian Democratic Party.

He served as a deputy representative to the Parliament of Norway from Østfold during the terms 2001–2005, 2005–2009 and 2009–2013.

On the local level Thune was the mayor of Rakkestad municipality from 1999 to 2007.

References

1948 births
Living people
People from Rakkestad
Deputy members of the Storting
Christian Democratic Party (Norway) politicians
Mayors of places in Østfold